The Boston Theater Marathon (BTM) is a Boston based charity theatre event consisting of 50 plays performed by 50 different theatre companies in 10 hours.

Founders Kate Snodgrass (Artistic Director of Boston Playwrights' Theatre) and Bill Lattanzi began the BTM in an effort to match playwrights with producing theatre companies. Over 400 plays have been performed since 1999, with about 50 performed each spring.  It is funded in part by the Boston University Humanities Foundation.

External links
Boston Playwrights' Theatre
Boston Theater Marathon

Culture of Boston
Theatre companies in Boston